The 1877 Scottish Cup Final was the fourth final of the Scottish Cup and the final of the 1876–77 Scottish Cup, the most prestigious knockout football competition in Scotland. The original match took place at Hamilton Crescent on 17 March 1877 and was contested by Vale of Leven and Rangers. The match was the first final to require two replays to decide a winner.

The original match ended in a 1–1 draw. Robert Paton opened the scoring for Vale of Leven, but Rangers equalised courtesy of an own goal from John McDougall. In the replay three weeks later, McDougall evened the scores for Vale of Leven after William Dunlop had opened the scoring for Rangers to force a second replay. In what turned out to be the decider, an early own goal from Jimmy Watson and two late goals from John Campbell Baird and Paton were enough to seal a narrow 3–2 victory for Vale of Leven to win the tournament for the first time. This was the first time the cup had been won by a team other than Queen's Park.

Background

This was the first final not to feature Queen's Park – who had won all three previous tournaments – after they were defeated by Vale of Leven in the quarter-finals. It was both Vale of Leven's and Rangers' début appearance in the Scottish Cup final.

Vale of Leven's previous best run in the competition saw them reach the semi-finals in 1875–76 before losing to eventual winners Queen's Park. Rangers had never made it beyond the second round before reaching the 1877 final.

The tie also marked the first competitive meetings of Rangers and Vale of Leven.

Route to the final

Both clubs entered the competition in the first round. Rangers won all of their matches before the final at the first attempt. However, the club received two byes through the duration of the tournament, one in the third round and one in the semi-final. Vale of Leven played in all rounds and also won all of their ties without needing a replay, conceding only one goal in the process.

Vale of Leven

In the competition's early years, the first few rounds were regionalised so Vale of Leven were drawn at home to fellow Dunbartonshire club Helensburgh in the first round. They began the competition with a tightly contested match at North Street Park, Alexandria on 30 September 1876 which they won 1–0. In the second round they faced local rivals Vale of Leven Rovers at the same venue, winning comfortably 7–0. The third round saw another tightly contested match as Vale defeated 3rd Lanark RV 1–0 at North Street Park before they eliminated Busby with a 4–0 home win in the fourth round. That set up a historic quarter-final with three-time defending champions Queen's Park at Hampden Park. Vale of Leven became the first team to defeat Queen's Park in the competition's history, ending their stranglehold on the trophy in the process, after winning 2–1 on 30 December 1876. The aftermath of the victory was marred by tense exchanges between the two clubs – whose representatives had already fallen out over arranging a friendly a year earlier –  regarding the alleged use of illegal spiked boots by the Vale of Leven players (local businessmen made attempts to resolve this in a positive manner with the creation of the Glasgow Merchants Charity Cup, but the Alexandria club refused to participate in its first year in a further dispute over gate receipt sharing). Two weeks later, Vale eased into the final, thumping Ayr Thistle 9–0 in the semi-final at the neutral Kinning Park.

Rangers

Rangers began the competition with a 4–1 win against Queen's Park Juniors at Kinning Park on 30 September 1876. In the second round, Dunlop, Watson, Marshall and Campbell all scored twice as they recorded an 8–0 home win against Towerhill. Rangers were then given a bye in the third round. They faced Ayrshire side Mauchline in the fourth round, winning 3–0 at Kinning Park thanks to goals from Watson, Marshall and Campbell. Dunbartonshire side Lennox were their opponents for the quarter-finals where goals from Dunlop, Marshall and Campbell were enough to see them through as 3–0 winners. With just three clubs reaching the semi-finals, Rangers were the lucky ones who received a bye to the final.

Match details

Original

{| width="100%"
|valign="top" width="50%"|

Replay

Teams unchanged from first match

Second replay

Teams unchanged from first match and replay

References

External links
London Hearts Scottish Football Reports 17 March 1877
London Hearts Scottish Football Reports 7 April 1877
London Hearts Scottish Football Reports 13 April 1877

1877
Cup Final
Rangers F.C. matches
Vale of Leven F.C. matches
19th century in Glasgow
March 1877 sports events
Partick